Silene gazulensis is a species of plant in the family Caryophyllaceae. It is endemic to Cádiz, Spain.  Its natural habitat is rocky areas. It is threatened by habitat loss.

References

gazulensis
Endemic flora of Spain
Endemic flora of the Iberian Peninsula
Critically endangered plants
Taxonomy articles created by Polbot